Dromius is a genus of ground beetle native to the Palearctic (including Europe), the Nearctic, the Near East, and North Africa. It contains the following species:

 Dromius agilis (Fabricius, 1787) 
 Dromius alesi Jedlicka, 1935 
 Dromius alfierii Peyerimhoff, 1927 
 Dromius alienus Bates, 1889 
 Dromius andrewesi (Jedlicka, 1955) 
 Dromius angusticollis J.Sahlberg, 1880 
 Dromius angustus Brulle, 1834 
 Dromius apterus Mateu, 1997 
 Dromius arcuatocollis (Basilewsky, 1957) 
 Dromius argentinensis Mateu, 1992 
 Dromius assamicus Jedlicka, 1964  
 Dromius ater Motschulsky, 1859 
 Dromius baehri Mateu, 1997 
 Dromius basilewskyi (A.Serrano, 1995) 
 Dromius batesi Habu, 1958 
 Dromius bhutanensis Mateu, 1977 
 Dromius bohumilae Mateu, 1985 
 Dromius bordoni Mateu, 1979 
 Dromius borysthenicus Motschulsky, 1850 
 Dromius brittoni Mateu, 1957 
 Dromius buettikeri Mateu, 1990 
 Dromius calathoides Landin, 1955 
 Dromius capnodes Andrewes, 1933 
 Dromius chihuahuae Casey, 1920 
 Dromius chinensis Jedlicka, 1965 
 Dromius chobauti Puel, 1924 
 Dromius codonotus Andrewes, 1933 
 Dromius columbianus Mateu, 1979 
 Dromius comma Andrewes, 1933 
 Dromius consobrinus (Peringuey, 1896) 
 Dromius crassipalpis Bates, 1883 
 Dromius cyaneus Dejean, 1831 
 Dromius cymindoides Andrewes, 1933 
 Dromius decellei (Basilewsky, 1968)  
 Dromius despectus (Jedlicka, 1940) 
 Dromius elongatulus Mateu, 1973 
 Dromius eremnus Andrewes, 1933 
 Dromius fenestratus (Fabricius, 1794) 
 Dromius flavipes Brulle, 1837 
 Dromius flohri Bates, 1883  
 Dromius formosanus (Jedlicka, 1940)  
 Dromius fukiensis (Jedlicka, 1956)  
 Dromius geisthardti Mateu, 1990 
 Dromius giachinoi Mateu, 1992 
 Dromius guatemalenus Bates, 1883 
 Dromius hagai Mateu, 1992 
 Dromius hauserianus Lorenz, 1998 
 Dromius hiemalis Kryzhanovskij & Mikhailov, 1987 
 Dromius hilarus Andrewes, 1937 
 Dromius indicus Andrewes, 1923 
 Dromius ivorensis (Basilewsky, 1968)  
 Dromius jureceki (Jedlicka, 1935) 
 Dromius kivuanus (Basilewsky, 1957) 
 Dromius kulti (Jedlicka, 1947) 
 Dromius kuntzei Polentz, 1939 
 Dromius kurilensis Lafer, 1989 
 Dromius laeviceps Motschulsky, 1850 
 Dromius laevipennis Landin, 1955 
 Dromius ledouxi Mateu, 1997 
 Dromius lieftincki Louwerens, 1952 
 Dromius lindemannae Jedlicka, 1963  
 Dromius macer Andrewes, 1947 
 Dromius macrocephalus Solier, 1849 
 Dromius maculipennis (Solier, 1849) 
 Dromius majorinus (Peringuey, 1896)  
 Dromius maritimus Lafer, 1989 
 Dromius martae Mateu, 1991 
 Dromius matsudai Habu, 1952 
 Dromius meghalayanus Mateu, 1997 
 Dromius meridionalis Dejean, 1825 
 Dromius meruanus (Basilewsky, 1962)  
 Dromius miwai (Jedlicka, 1940)  
 Dromius murgabicus Kryzhanovskij & Mikhailov, 1987 
 Dromius nagatomii Jedlicka, 1966  
 Dromius negrei Mateu, 1973 
 Dromius neotropicalis Mateu, 1973 
 Dromius nepalensis Jedlicka, 1966 
 Dromius nigrofasciatus Steinheil, 1869 
 Dromius nipponicus Habu, 1983 
 Dromius nyamukubiensis (Burgeon, 1937)  
 Dromius orestes Andrewes, 1933 
 Dromius orthogonioides Bates, 1886 
 Dromius pallidicollis (Peringuey, 1896) 
 Dromius piceus Dejean, 1831 
 Dromius plutenkoi Lafer, 1989  
 Dromius prolixus Bates, 1883 
 Dromius quadraticollis A.Morawitz, 1862 
 Dromius quadrimaculatus (Linnaeus, 1758) 
 Dromius rhodesianus (Basilewsky, 1957) 
 Dromius rufocastaneus Mateu, 1997 
 Dromius rugulosus Mateu, 1973 
 Dromius ruwenzoricus (Burgeon, 1937) 
 Dromius schneideri Crotch, 1871 
 Dromius semiplagiatus Reitter, 1887 
 Dromius simplicior Antoine, 1963 
 Dromius sinuatus Landin, 1955 
 Dromius somalicus (Basilewsky, 1957)  
 Dromius sulcatulus Solier, 1849 
 Dromius tolanus (Basilewsky, 1953) 
 Dromius ugandanus (Basilewsky, 1949) 
 Dromius umbrinus Landin, 1955  
 Dromius univestis (Jedlicka, 1940) 
 Dromius vaneyeni (Basilewsky, 1957) 
 Dromius venezolanus Mateu, 1973 
 Dromius wittmeri Mateu, 1977

References

External links
Dromius at Fauna Europaea

Lebiinae
Taxa named by Franco Andrea Bonelli